Nicolas Dickner (born 1972 in Rivière-du-Loup, Quebec) is a Canadian novelist and short story writer. He is best known for his 2005 novel Nikolski, which has won numerous literary awards in Canada both in its original French and translated English editions. His books have been translated into over 10 languages.

Education 
Dickner studied at Laval University, where he was inspired by a course on biblical literary history. He studied art and literature during his bachelor's degree, then went on to complete a master's degree in creative writing. His master's work was published as the anthology L’Encyclopédie du petit cercle.

In 2017, Dickner completed a master's at the Université de Montréal on public sector data and its applications.

Career 
His first novel, Nikolski, was released in 2005 and became an instant success in Quebec. It marked a new wave of Quebec literature with appeal to an international audience and fresh ideas no longer drawing comparisons to other twentieth-century French-Canadian works.

He is published by the Quebec City-based publisher Éditions Alto, a small press founded by Antoine Tanguay who Dickner met in university.

In 2014, Dickner and Dominique Fortier published Révolutions, a collaborative project for which they each wrote a short piece each day for a year based on a word chosen from the French Republican Calendar.

He currently lives in Montreal with his family, where he is a literary columnist for the alternative weekly newspaper Voir. He also works in translation In 2015 he finished a translation of Andrew Kaufman's Born Weird. Dickner has travelled throughout Latin America and Europe. He wrote in Bamberg for a period of time.

He has spent time as webmaster for the Union des écrivaines et des écrivains québécois (UNEQ) and as a database programmer in Peru.

Works
 L'Encyclopédie du petit cercle, 2000
 Nikolski, 2005
English translation by Lazer Lederhendler published 2008.
 Traité de balistique, 2006
Written under the pen name Alexandre Bourbaki in collaboration with Bernard Wright-Laflamme.
 Tarmac, 2009
Apocalypse for Beginners, English translation by Lazer Lederhendler published 2010.
 Le Romancier portatif : 52 chroniques à emporter, 2011
A selection from Dickner's column in Voir.
 Révolutions, 2014
 Six degrés de liberté, 2015

Themes 
Dickner's books often feature characters with peculiar fixations, like the end of the world in Tarmac, or shipping containers in Six degrés de liberté. He also introduces "geeky" references and features computer technology in Nikolski and Six degrés de liberté. His prose has a sense of "absurdist poetry" through his use of lists and technical asides. More than one of his characters becomes fascinated with consumer waste and either researching or reusing refuse. Travel and wanderlust are recurring topics throughout his works, as is loneliness.

Dickner uses fragmented stories and alternating perspectives to build up the narrative in his novels.

Awards

 L'encyclopédie du petit cercle
 2001 - Prix littéraire Adrienne-Choquette
 2001 - Prix Jovette-Bernier
 Nikolski
 2006 - Prix des libraires
 2006 - Prix littéraire des collégiens
 2006 - Prix Anne-Hébert
 2006 - Prix Printemps des Lecteurs–Lavinal
 2008 - Governor General's Award for French to English translation
 2010 - Winner of Canada Reads 2010
 Six degrés de liberté
2015 - Governor General's Award for Fiction (French)

References

External links
  Nicolas Dickner

1972 births
Canadian male novelists
Canadian short story writers in French
Writers from Quebec
People from Rivière-du-Loup
French Quebecers
Living people
Canadian novelists in French
Canadian male short story writers
21st-century Canadian novelists
21st-century Canadian short story writers
21st-century Canadian male writers
Université Laval alumni
Governor General's Award-winning fiction writers